The Ramadan-class missile boat are a series of missile boats that have been in service with the Egyptian Navy since 1981, acquired from the United Kingdom.

Ships in class
 670 Ramadan 
 672 Khybar
 674 El Kadesseya 
 676 El Yarmouk
 678 Badr
 680 Hetteen

References
 http://www.hazegray.org/worldnav/africa/egypt.htm#1
 https://www.flickr.com/photos/67307569@N00/161157094/

Missile boat classes
Missile boats of the Egyptian Navy